Just for You is a 2017 South Korean drama film directed by Park Byoung-hwan.

Plot
Story of a young man who travels to Vietnam and heals his wounds of love with music.

Cast
Tim as Seong-min
Son Ha-jung as Hye-joon
Choi Jong-nam as Chairman Choi
Cha Soo-bin as Jeong-bae
Park Seon-woong
Han Hyeon-ah
Kim Na-on
Jeong I-sak
Chan Choo-rin
Park Yoon-geun

References

External links

 

2017 films
South Korean drama films
2010s Korean-language films
2010s South Korean films